Memorias históricas sobre la marina, comercio y artes de la antigua ciudad de Barcelona. (Historical Records on marine, trade and arts of the ancient city of Barcelona) is a summary paper on the Navy, the trade and the arts of the city of Barcelona, written by the famous Antonio de Capmany y Montpalau.

Description 
It's a monumental magnum opus on the former Barcelona economy, noting the aspects that made the city one of the trading powers of the Mediterranean starting in the Middle Ages until well entered into the sixteenth century: its important merchant marine, strong guild structure and industrial productivity all supported by numerous documents from its archives, many of them unpublished until then.

The book was illustrated with cartoons headers and drawn by well-known artists (Camarón, Montaña, etc.) and copper gravures etched mostly by the artist Moles. Antoni Palau comments: "..this basic title contains "an arsenal of documents and first-hand data" that compose altogether a very important work.."

Together with the four volumes of Memorias históricas, there is a fifth volume: "Code of maritime customs of Barcelona" that reproduces the Book of the Consulate of the Sea of Barcelona, forming a collection of five volumes, with an extraordinary historical and documentary value about the history of Catalan Navy.

Structure of the work
Great room, 4 vols.
 Vol. 1: 3 leaf, XXIV, 185, 260, 148, VI p;..
 Vol. 2: 2 sheet, XVI, 471, XIII, XXX, 124, III p;..
 Vol. 3: 2 sheet, XX, 377 p XI;..
 Vol. 4: 3 leaf, XXXIV, 418, p 133)...

Followed by:
 Vol. V: "Code of the maritime customs of Barcelona" 1 sheet, LXXXI, p 368;.. 1 sheet., 225 p.

See also

 Angelino Dulcert
 Portolan chart
 Catalan cartography
 La Cartografía Mallorquina
 Próspero de Bofarull y Mascaró
 Abraham Cresques
 Consulate of the Sea
Book of the Consulate of the Sea

References

External links
Portolan charts from S.XIII to S.XVI - Additions, Corrections, Updates

History of Barcelona
1779 non-fiction books
Book series introduced in 1779
Nautical reference works
History of navigation
Spanish essays